H. A. Lorentz  may refer to:
 Hendrik Antoon Lorentz (1853–1928), Dutch physicist who shared the Nobel Prize in 1902
 Hendrikus Albertus Lorentz (1871–1944), Dutch explorer and diplomat